Koninklijke Sporting Hasselt are a Belgian football team, from Hasselt, capital of the Limburg province, Belgium. They will play in the 2021–22 Belgian Division 2.

History 
The club was first founded in 1926 but merged in 2001 with Kermt and was refounded as KSK Hasselt-Kermt.

External links

References 

Sport in Hasselt
Football clubs in Belgium
Association football clubs established in 1926